Thomas Lodowys (alternatively spelled Lodowis) was appointed Bishop of Killala on 9 August 1381, but did not assume the position.
Brian mac Donchadha Ó Dubha had been elected by the Dean and Chapter that same year, but Pope Urban IV had decided to reserve the selection of the bishop to himself, and picked Lodowys instead.
Lodowys was a Dominican, and died in 1388.

References

1388 deaths
14th-century Roman Catholic bishops in Ireland
Medieval Gaels from Ireland
Bishops of Killala
People from County Mayo
Year of birth unknown